Álvaro Vicente (born 25 January 1928) was a Spanish boxer. He competed in the men's bantamweight event at the 1948 Summer Olympics.

References

1928 births
Living people
Spanish male boxers
Olympic boxers of Spain
Boxers at the 1948 Summer Olympics
Sportspeople from Valencia
Bantamweight boxers